Kylie Minogue is an Australian singer and actress. Her breakthrough role in the soap opera Neighbours (1986–1988) as Charlene Robinson earned her a Silver Logie Award for Most Popular Actress in 1987. At the following ceremony, she became the first person to win four Logie Awards at one event and the youngest Gold Logie recipient at nineteen. Interested in pursuing a career in music, Minogue signed to Mushroom Records in 1987 and released her self-titled debut album, Kylie, in 1988. Her songs—a cover of "The Loco-Motion" and "I Should Be So Lucky"—consecutively won the award for Highest Selling Single at the ARIA Music Awards of 1988 and 1989. Minogue's contributions to the subsequent studio albums Enjoy Yourself (1989), Let's Get to It (1991), Kylie Minogue (1994), and Impossible Princess (1997) earned her four nominations for the ARIA Award for Best Female Artist. In 1996, her duet with rock band Nick Cave and the Bad Seeds, "Where the Wild Roses Grow", won three ARIA Awards for Best Pop Release, Single of the Year, and Song of the Year.

Minogue signed to Parlophone in 1999 and released Light Years the following year, which was nominated for the ARIA Award for Album of the Year. Her eighth studio Fever (2001) was a commercial and critical success, winning her first Brit Award for International Album in 2002. Its lead single, "Can't Get You Out of My Head", garnered accolades for Single of the Year at the 16th ARIA Music Awards and the 2002 Edison Award. Two other singles from Fever, "Love at First Sight" and "Come into My World", were nominated for the Grammy Award for Best Dance Recording, the latter winning in 2004—the first time an Australian music artist had won in a major category since Men at Work in 1983. For her work as songwriter for "Slow" from Body Language (2003), Minogue received two nominations for Ivor Novello Awards for "Best Contemporary Song" and "International Hit of the Year". X (2007) was Minogue's first Grammy nomination in the Best Dance/Electronic Album category, her fifth overall. Minogue's fifteenth studio album, Disco (2020), garnered nominations for Billboard Music Award for Top Dance/Electronic Album, ARIA Awards for Best Adult Contemporary Album and Best Artist.

The Phonographic Performance Company of Australia ranked Minogue as the Most Broadcast Artist of 2002, 2003, and 2005. She received the Special Achievement Award in 1989, and two more Outstanding Achievement Awards in 1990 and 2002 by Australian Recording Industry Association, who also inducted her into the ARIA Hall of Fame in 2011. Minogue received the JC Williamson Award in 2013 for her contribution to Australian live entertainment. In the United Kingdom, she has achieved eight number-one albums for five consecutive decades, earning Minogue an entry in the 2020 Guinness World Records. She received a special O2 Silver Clef Award in 2012 to celebrate her 25-year music career, and an honorary Doctor of Health Science degree from Anglia Ruskin University in 2011 for her work in raising awareness for breast cancer. She was appointed an Officer of the Order of the British Empire (OBE) in the 2008 New Year Honours for services to music. For her contribution to the enrichment of French culture, the French government appointed her as a Chevalier de l'Ordre des Arts et des Lettres, while the Britain-Australia Society recognised Minogue in April 2017 for her contribution to improving relations between Britain and Australia.

Awards and nominations

State and academic honours

Other tributes

Notes

References

Sources

External links 
 
 

Awards and nominations received
Minoque, Kylie
Minogue, Kylie
Minogue, Kylie